Richard "Rick" Powell (born March 22, 1989 in West Chester, Pennsylvania) is an American slalom canoeist who has competed since the mid-2000s. He was eliminated in the qualifying round of the C2 event at the 2008 Summer Olympics in Beijing, finishing in 11th place.

Powell has spent most of his career specializing in the K1 class, but he did compete in the C2 class partnering Casey Eichfeld from 2006 to 2008.

World Cup individual podiums

1 Pan American Championship counting for World Cup points

References

1989 births
American male canoeists
Canoeists at the 2008 Summer Olympics
Living people
Olympic canoeists of the United States
People from West Chester, Pennsylvania